Richard John Howell (October 12, 1903 – July 20, 1967) was an American competition swimmer who represented the United States at the 1924 Summer Olympics in Paris.

As a 20-year-old at the 1924 Olympics, he swam for the gold-medal-winning American relay team in the men's 4×200-meter freestyle relay.  After swimming in the preliminary heats and semifinals and helping the American relay team qualify for the final, he was replaced by Johnny Weissmuller.  In the semifinals he was a member of the team that set a new world record of 9:59.4, breaking the ten-minute barrier in the event for the first time.  Howell also competed in the men's 1,500-meter freestyle; he qualified for the semi-finals but did not advance.

Howell was born in Chicago, Illinois.  He attended Hyde Park High School in Chicago, and set several national high school records while swimming for Hyde Park.

After high school, he enrolled in Northwestern University in Evanston, Illinois, where he swam for the Northwestern Wildcats swimming and diving team in National Collegiate Athletic Association (NCAA) and Big Ten Conference competition from 1922 to 1926.  Competing as a Wildcat, he won three NCAA national collegiate titles including the 400- and 1500-meter freestyle events in 1924 and the 220-yard freestyle in 1925.  He also captured four Big Ten titles, and set ten Big Ten freestyle records.  Remembered as one of Northwestern's all-time greatest swimmers, Howell was also a member of three intercollegiate championship water polo teams and wrestled while at Northwestern.  In his final year as a Northwestern undergraduate, Howell married fellow student Elizabeth Fletcher.

Howell died in Arlington Heights, Illinois in 1967.

See also
 List of Northwestern University alumni
 List of Olympic medalists in swimming (men)

References

External links
 

1903 births
1967 deaths
American male freestyle swimmers
World record setters in swimming
Northwestern Wildcats men's swimmers
Olympic swimmers of the United States
Swimmers from Chicago
Swimmers at the 1924 Summer Olympics